Blisworth railway station was a junction station on the London and North Western Railway (today, the West Coast Main Line), the Northampton and Banbury Junction Railway, and the Northampton and Peterborough Railway. As well as providing interchange between the lines, the station served the village of Blisworth in Northamptonshire and its environs. The station was opened by the London and Birmingham Railway (L&BR) in 1838.

History
The station was opened on 17 September 1838. In 1845 the L&BR opened its Northampton and Peterborough Railway, a line which connected Peterborough East and Northampton Bridge Street from a junction nearby. The station was rebuilt  to the north in 1853, closer to the junction, to facilitate changing trains.

In 1846 the line, along with the L&BR, became part of the London and North Western Railway.

In 1866 a line was opened to Banbury by the Northampton & Banbury Junction Railway. This railway built a small corrugated iron motive power depot at the station in 1882, together with a turntable and other servicing facilities. This was closed in 1929, but locomotives continued to be serviced in the yard until the closure of the station.

At grouping in 1923 it became part of the London Midland and Scottish Railway.

The station closed on 4 January 1960, and was demolished soon afterward. The Blisworth Hotel facing the station, now The Walnut Tree Inn, remains in business.

Routes

References

Disused railway stations in Northamptonshire
Former London and Birmingham Railway stations
Railway stations in Great Britain opened in 1838
Railway stations in Great Britain closed in 1960
1838 establishments in England
1960 disestablishments in England
West Northamptonshire District